Lecerf is a French surname. Notable people with the surname include:

Alfred Lecerf (1948–2019), Belgian politician
Antoine Lecerf (1950–2011), French general
Jean-René Lecerf (born 1951), French politician
Olivier Lecerf (1928–2006), French businessman and racehorse owner

French-language surnames